The Halsey Street station is a local station on the BMT Jamaica Line of the New York City Subway. Located at Halsey Street and Broadway at the border of Bedford–Stuyvesant and Bushwick, Brooklyn, it is served by the J train at all times. The Z train skips this station when it operates.

Station layout

This elevated station, opened on August 19, 1885, has two side platforms and three tracks; the center express track is not used in regular service. Both platforms have beige windscreens and green canopies and support columns with red roofs along the entire length except for a small section at either end, where they have high mesh fences instead. The station signs are in the black name plates in white Helvetica lettering.

The 2008 artwork here is called SOL'SCRYPT by SOL'SAX. It consists of glass mosaic panels on the platform windscreens and station house depicting various images of African-American heritage.

Exits
The station has exits on both the west (railroad north) end and the east (railroad south) end of its platforms.

On the east end, each platform has a single staircase leading to an elevated station house beneath the tracks. It has a turnstile bank and token booth. Outside fare control, two staircases lead to both western corners of Halsey Street and Broadway.

The western exits are now emergency exits leading to both eastern corners of Jefferson Avenue and Broadway. These exits were closed in the 1980s due to high crime. There is a closed station house around the intermediate level of the staircases.

References

External links 
 
 Station Reporter — J train
 The Subway Nut — Halsey Street Pictures
 MTA's Arts For Transit — Halsey Street (BMT Jamaica Line)
 Halsey Street entrance from Google Maps Street View
 Platforms from Google Maps Street View

BMT Jamaica Line stations
1885 establishments in New York (state)
New York City Subway stations in Brooklyn
Railway stations in the United States opened in 1885
Bushwick, Brooklyn
Bedford–Stuyvesant, Brooklyn